Omorgus endroedyi is a species of hide beetle in the subfamily Omorginae and subgenus Afromorgus.

References

endroedyi
Beetles described in 1979